Add a Friend is a German comedy-drama created and written by Sebastian Wehlings and Christian Lyra for TNT Serie. The series follows a group of people and their lives in the social network.

This is the first German production produced exclusively for premium television. A first season consisting of ten episodes were ordered. Add a Friend is set to premiere on September 19, 2012, on Wednesday nights at 8:15 pm.

Synopsis
After Felix (Ken Duken) had a car accident he is left bedridden with a complicated leg fracture. His sole window to the outside world becomes his laptop. Via his social network he stays in contact with his best friend Tom (Friedrich Mücke) and gets in touch with his old high-school crush Julia (Friederike Kempter). Then there is the mysterious girl Vanessa (Emilia Schüle) and Felix' parents, Gisela (Gisela Schneeberger) and Gerd (Dieter Hollinder), who he only has contact to through video chat.

Cast
 Ken Duken as Felix
 Friedrich Mücke as Tom
 Friederike Kempter as Julia
 Emilia Schüle as Vanessa
 Gisela Schneeberger as Gisela
 Dietrich Hollinderbäumer as Gerd
 Ralph Herforth as Marc
 Jo Kern as Rita

Production
After the announcement of the first television series by Turner Broadcasting System in Germany, the production could win actor Ken Duken, who's internationally known for his performance in Inglourious Basterds and started filming a 10-episode season in January 2012. The production ended after almost two months at the end of February.

References

External links

2012 German television series debuts
2014 German television series endings
German comedy-drama television series
German-language television shows
TNT Serie original programming
Grimme-Preis for fiction winners